The class 3SUB were DC suburban electric multiple units introduced by the London and South Western Railway in 1915 and introduced by the Southern Railway in the period up to 1939. The class designation 3SUB was not used by the Southern Railway, although some authors refer to these units as 3SUB. When rebuilt to four cars in the 1940s, they became class 4SUB.

Background
The London, Brighton and South Coast Railway (LBSC) was the first of the three major companies that were to form the Southern Railway to electrify some of its lines in London. The lines were electrified at 6.7 kV 25 Hz AC, using overhead supply. Public services began on 1 December 1909.

The London and South Western Railway (LSWR) electrified its lines on the third rail DC system. Public services began on 25 October 1915.

In 1922, the South Eastern and Chatham Railway (SECR) sought permission to electrify certain lines in London. On 1 January 1923, the LSBC, LSWR and SECR were merged into the Southern Railway (SR).

Classes

LSWR electric multiple units and trailer sets

Eighty-four electric multiple units, numbered E1–E84, were constructed in 1913 by converting steam-hauled carriages which had been built from 1904 for suburban service. The conversions being carried out at Eastleigh Works. Each multiple unit comprised two motor coaches and a trailer. The units weighed 95 tons. They seated between 172 and 190 people in first and third class. These were the first trains on the LSWR not to offer second class accommodation. Electrical equipment was by the British Westinghouse Company, each motor carriage had two  electric motors. In 1914, 24 two-coach trailer units were constructed at Eastleigh to work with the multiple units. Each comprised an eight-compartment and a nine-compartment carriage. They were third class only. The SR renumbered the electric multiple units 1201-84 and the trailer sets 1001-24.

First class accommodation was reduced to 24, whilst third class was increased to 160. These units returned to London in 1934 and regained their original configuration on the introduction of the 2NOL units. In 1934, some of these units were rebuilt. The motor carriages were given new underframes and lengthened. New motor and unpowered bogies supplied. As rebuilt, they were long. They seated 56 first class and 180 third class passengers. Weights varied between 109 and 114 tons.

SR electric multiple units and trailer sets

These units were built by the SR. Most of the units and trailer sets were converted from steam-hauled carriages.
Sets 989-1000
Two-coach trailer sets converted in 1937-38. One carriage was a ten compartment ex-LSWR carriage.
A total of 51 suburban electric vehicles were destroyed by enemy action during WWII.

Sets 1025-37
Two-coach trailer sets converted in 1925 from ex-LBSC nine-compartment bogie third carriages. Used with units 1285-1310. They seated 180 third class passengers.

Sets 1038-1050
Two-coach trailer sets converted in 1934.

Sets 1051-1120
Two-coach trailer sets converted in 1925 from ex-LBSC nine-compartment bogie third carriages. Used with units 1401-95 and 1525-34. They seated 180 third class passengers.

Sets 1121-67
Two-coach trailer sets converted in 1928 for use on Eastern Section services. Each set comprised an ex-LSWR eleven compartment carriage and an ex-SECR eight compartment carriage. They seated 190 third class passengers.

Sets 1168-80, 1187
Two-coach trailer sets converted in 1928 from ex-LBSC carriages, incorporating underframes from ex-CP motor carriages. They seated 190 third class passengers.

Sets 1181-86
Two-coach trailer sets converted in 1929-30 from ex-LBSC carriages.

Sets 1188-94
Two-coach trailer sets converted in 1934.

Sets 1195-1198
Two-coach trailer sets converted in 1934 from ex-LSWR carriages. They seated 190 third class passengers.

Sets 1199-1200
Two-coach trailer sets converted in 1937-38. One carriage was a ten compartment ex-LSWR carriage.

Units 1285-1310
Three-coach units built new in 1925 for Waterloo to Guildford via Cobham services. The motor carriages were built by the Metropolitan Carriage Wagon & Finance Co. Ltd. and the trailers were built by the Birmingham Railway Carriage and Wagon Co. Ltd. All vehicles had steel panels on a teak frame. They seated 28 first and 120 third class passengers.

Units 1401-95 and 1525–34
Three-coach units converted from ex-SECR four- and six-wheel carriages at Ashford Works and Brighton Works. They seated 56 first and 180 third class passengers.

Units 1496-1524
Three-coach units built new for use on Eastern Section services. The motor carriages were built by the Metropolitan Carriage Wagon & Finance Co. Ltd. and the trailers were built by the Birmingham Railway Carriage and Wagon Co. Ltd. All vehicles had steel panels on a teak frame. They seated 56 first and 180 third class passengers.

Units 1579-84
Three-coach units  converted in 1937 from ex-LSWR bogie carriages. Fitted with electro-pneumatic control gear.

Units 1593-99
Three-coach units  converted in 1934-35 from ex-LSWR bogie carriages.

Units 1601-30
Three-coach units converted in 1928 from ex-SECR bogie carriages. They seated 56 first and 180 third class passengers.

Units 1631-57
Three-coach units converted in 1928 from ex-LBSC bogie carriages.

Units 1658-1701
Three-coach units converted in 1928 from ex-LSWR bogie carriages. They seated 56 first and 180 third class passengers.

Units 1702-72
Three-coach units converted in 1928 from ex-LBSC bogie carriages. Units 1717-70 were converted from the overhead electric units formerly used on the ex-LBSC lines.

Units 1773-85
Three-coach units converted in 1930 from ex-LSWR bogie carriages. They seated 56 first and 180 third class passengers.

Units 1786-96
Three-coach units converted in 1928 from ex-LSWR six-wheel carriages. They seated 56 first and 180 third class passengers.

Units 1797-1801
Three-coach units converted in 1930 from ex-LBSC bogie carriages. Unit 1801 was renumbered 1600 in April 1934.

Units 1901-08

Units 1909-12

Class 4SUB

From 1942, units 1201-84, the LSWR-built units, gained an additional ex-LSWR trailer of ten or eleven compartments. Those that gained a ten compartment carriage were renumbered 4131-71. Those that gained an eleven compartment carriage were renumbered 4195-4234. In 1945, units 1285-1310 each gained a new ten compartment trailer and were renumbered 4300-25. In 1945-46, units 1496-1524 each gained a new ten compartment trailer and were renumbered 4326-54. All other three car units also gained a new trailer between 1946 and 1948. They were renumbered 4401-4594, 4601-08, and 4613-14. Weights varied between 132 and 140 tons and they could seat between 358 and 370 people. Units 4111-30 and 4364-76 were built new in 1946-47. British Railways built further batches; 4277-99 in 1948-49, 4621-59 in 1949, 4653-4709 in 1950 and 4710-54 in 1951.

Departmental service

Unit 1782, which became unit 4579 when reformed as a 4SUB, was withdrawn from passenger service in 1956. It reverted to three carriages and entered departmental service as an instruction unit, numbered S10S. One carriage was converted to provide lecture and projection facilities. Later renumbered 053, the unit was withdrawn in December 1975.

Accidents and incidents
On 9 July 1928, unit 1702 was severely damaged in a sidelong collision with B2X class locomotive No. B210 at  after the driver of B210 misread signals. Two people were killed and nine were injured, six seriously.
On 19 April 1934, unit 1790 was run into at London Bridge, severely damaging a motor coach. A replacement was converted from an ex-LSWR carriage.

On 2 April 1937, units 1473 and 1615 were amongst those involved in a rear-end collision at  due to misuse of the Sykes Lock and Block by a signalman. Ten people were killed and 80 were injured. A motor carriage in each unit was written off. Replacements were converted from ex-LSWR carriages.
On 13 August 1937, an accident at  damaged trailer set 1152. Its ex-SECR carriage was consequently replaced by an ex-LBSC nine compartment carriage.
On 4 November 1942 two trains formed of suburban electric stock were involved in a collision at  due to misuse of the Sykes Lock and Block by the signalman. Two people were killed and at least one was injured.

On 24 October 1947, two electric multiple unit trains were involved in a rear-end collision at  due to misuse of the Sykes Lock and Block by the signalman. The first train was of mainline stock, which was run into by a train formed of two three-car units. A total of 32 people were killed and 183 were injured.

Wartime losses
Fifty-one suburban electric carriages were destroyed by enemy action during WWII. Incidents where vehicles were destroyed or severely damaged include - 
1940
On 16 August, a bomb near  severely damaged two carriages, with eleven others also being damaged. Units involved were 1131, 1145, 1237, 1476 and 1516-17.
On 8 September 1940, an incendiary bomb at Victoria destroyed three carriages and damaged two others from units 1129 and 1448. Eleven carriages were damaged at Wimbledon Carriage Sidings, including those from units 1115, 1226, 1413, 1474 and 1707. An incendiary bomb at  caused the destruction of two carriages and damage to three more from units 1454 and 1802.
On 14 October, the carriage sheds at Selhurst were bombed. Six vehicles were destroyed, two severely damaged and ten others were also damaged. Units affected include 1009, 1044, 1139, 1170, 1184, 1259, 1426 and 1785.
One vehicle was destroyed, another severely damaged.
On 19 October, a train was bombed at Durnsford Road, Wimbledon, destroying one carriage, severely damaging another and causing damage to the other six. Units involved were 1439 and 1530, the identity of the trailer set is unknown.
Three vehicles were destroyed. Units involved included 1473, 1501 and 1745.
On 30 October, an incendiary bomb damaged three units at Selhurst Depot, destroying one carriage and damaging the other eight. Units involved were 1259, 1414 and 1618.
On 4 November, a bomb brought down the footbridge at  onto a suburban train. Two carriages were severely damaged.

1941
On 17 April, incendiary bombs dropped at Charing Cross set four train on fire, destroying four carriages and severely damaging two others. Units involved included 1612 and 1722.
On 25 April, a bomb at Lancing Works destroyed one carriage and severely damaged the other two of Unit 1305.
On 11 May, a bomb at  destroyed one carriage and severely damaged the other two of unit 1799.

1942
On 30 September, two carriages were severely damaged and sixteen others were also damaged at Lancing Works. Units involved included 1256, 1485, 1507 and 1776.

1944
On 4 February, two carriages were destroyed and 34 damaged at Slades Green. Units involved included 1006, 1139, 1168, 1230, 1251, 1286, 1433, 1484, 1502, 1621. 1683, 1729, 1741 and 1788.
On 24 February, a train was bombed at Loco Jn, . One carriage was destroyed, four severely damaged and the other three were damaged. Units involved were 1061, 1702 and 1784.
Five other vehicles were also damaged. Units involved included 1509 and 1740.
On 18 June, a fragmentation bomb at Charing Cross severely damaged one vehicle and damaged six others. Units involved were 1104, 1293 and 1746.
On 23 June, a fragmentation bomb at  destroyed one carriage, severely damaged a second and damaged 28 others. Units involved included 126, 1031, 1065, 1180, 1434, 1527, 1529, 1621, 1628, 1640,1679, 1704 and 1799.
On 30 June, a fragmentation bomb destroyed three carriages and damaged five others at Wimbledon Park Sidings. Units involved included 1598 and 1692.
On 4 July, fragmentation bombs severely damaged two carriages and damaged 74 others at Wimbledon Park Sidings. Amongst the units involved were 1278 and 1496.
Eight trailer sets and four suburban units were amongst the casualties.
On 14 July, a fragmentation bomb severely damaged three carriages and damaged eleven others at Selhurst. Units affected were 1079, 1186, 1413, 1629, 1715 and 1733.
On 26 October, a fragmentation bomb destroyed three carriages, severely damaged five and slightly damaged five more near . Units involved were 1023, 1267, 1268 and 1793.
On 1 November, a V-2 rocket severely damaged two carriages and damaged eighteen others near . Units involved included 1193, 1466 and 1668.
On 25 November, two carriages of unit 1138 were wrecked by a V-2 rocket at New Cross Gate.

1945
On 6 January, two carriages were destroyed, seven were severely damaged and eleven others were damaged by a V-2 rocket at Peckham Rye. Units involved included 1065, 1109, 1427 and 1428.

References

Sources

London and South Western Railway
Southern Railway (UK) electric multiple units
Train-related introductions in 1915